The Apartment is a 1960 American romantic comedy-drama film directed and produced by Billy Wilder from a screenplay he co-wrote with I. A. L. Diamond. It stars Jack Lemmon, Shirley MacLaine, Fred MacMurray, Ray Walston, Jack Kruschen, David Lewis, Willard Waterman, David White, Hope Holiday and Edie Adams.

The film follows an insurance clerk (Lemmon) who, in the hope of climbing the corporate ladder, lets more senior coworkers use his Upper West Side apartment to conduct extramarital affairs. He is attracted to an elevator operator (MacLaine) in his office building, unaware that she is having an affair with his immediate boss (MacMurray).

The Apartment was distributed by United Artists to widespread critical acclaim and was a commercial success, despite controversy owing to its subject matter. It became the 8th highest grossing film of 1960. At the 33rd Academy Awards, the film was nominated for ten awards, and won five, including Best Picture, Best Director and Best Screenplay. Lemmon, MacLaine and Kruschen were Oscar-nominated. Lemmon and MacLaine won Golden Globe Awards for their performances. It provided the basis for Promises, Promises, a 1968 Broadway musical by Burt Bacharach, Hal David and Neil Simon.

Ever since its release, The Apartment has come to be regarded as one of the greatest films ever made, appearing in lists by the American Film Institute and Sight and Sound magazine. In 1994, it was one of the 25 films selected for inclusion to the United States Library of Congress National Film Registry.

Plot
C.C. "Bud" Baxter is a lonely office drudge at an insurance corporation in New York City. To climb the corporate ladder, he allows four company managers to take turns borrowing his Upper West Side apartment, 51 West 67th Street, for their extramarital affairs. Baxter meticulously juggles the "booking" schedule, but the steady stream of women convinces his neighbors that he is a playboy.

Baxter solicits glowing performance reviews from the four managers and submits them to personnel director Jeff Sheldrake, who then promises to promote himbut Sheldrake also demands use of the apartment for his own affairs, beginning that night. As compensation for this short notice, he gives Baxter two theater tickets for that evening. Bud asks his secret crush, Fran Kubelik, an elevator operator in the office building, to join him. She agrees, but first meets up with a "former fling", who turns out to be Sheldrake. When Sheldrake dissuades her from breaking up with him, promising to divorce his wife, they head to Baxter’s apartment, while Baxter waits outside the theater.

During the company's raucous Christmas party, Sheldrake's secretary, Miss Olsen, tells Fran that her boss has had affairs with other female employees, including herself. Fran confronts Sheldrake at Baxter’s apartment, but he claims he loves her, then heads back to his suburban family.

Realizing that Fran is the woman Sheldrake has been taking to his apartment, Baxter lets himself be picked up by a married lady at a local bar. When they arrive at his apartment, he discovers Fran, passed out on his bed from an apparent suicidal overdose of sleeping pills. He ditches the woman from the bar and enlists Dr. Dreyfuss, a medical doctor living in the next-door apartment, to revive Fran. When Baxter makes Dreyfuss believe that he was the cause of the incident, Dreyfuss scolds him for philandering and advises him to "be a mensch."

Fran spends two days recuperating in the apartment, during which a bond develops between them, especially after he confesses to his own suicide attempt over unrequited feelings for a woman who now sends him a fruitcake every Christmas. Fran says she has always suffered bad luck in her love life.

As Baxter prepares a romantic dinner, one of the managers arrives for a tryst. Baxter persuades him and his companion to leave, but the manager recognizes Fran and informs his colleagues. Later confronted by Fran's brother-in-law, Karl Matuschka, who is looking for her, the jealous managers direct Karl to Baxter’s apartment. Baxter deflects the brother's-in-law anger over Fran's wayward behavior by once again assuming all responsibility. Karl punches him, and Fran kisses Baxter for protecting her.

When Sheldrake learns that Miss Olsen tipped off Fran about his affairs, he fires her, but she retaliates by spilling all to Sheldrake's wife, who promptly throws her husband out. With no regrets for his behavior, Sheldrake believes that this situation just makes it easier to pursue Fran, although she hints that she is losing interest. Having promoted Baxter to an even higher position, which also gives him a key to the executive washroom, Sheldrake expects Baxter to loan out his apartment yet again for him and Fran. Baxter gives him back the washroom key instead, proclaiming that he has decided to become a mensch, and quits the firm, forbidding Sheldrake from ever bringing anyone to his apartment again. He decides to move out of the apartment and begins to pack his belongings.

That night at a New Year's Eve party, Sheldrake indignantly tells Fran about Baxter quitting. Realizing her love for Baxter, Fran abandons Sheldrake and runs to the apartment. At the door, she hears an apparent gunshot. Fearing that Baxter has attempted suicide again, she frantically pounds on the door. Baxter opens the door with a bottle of champagne in his hand, having just popped the cork. As they sit down to a game of cards, Fran reveals that she is on her own, like he is. When he asks about Sheldrake, she replies, "We'll send him a fruitcake every Christmas,” prompting him to declare his love for her. She hands him the cards and affectionately tells him to "Shut up and deal".

Cast

Production

Immediately following the success of Some Like It Hot, Wilder and Diamond wished to make another film with Lemmon. Wilder had originally planned to cast Paul Douglas as Sheldrake; however, after he died unexpectedly, MacMurray was cast.

The initial concept came from Brief Encounter by Noël Coward, in which Laura Jesson (Celia Johnson) meets Alec Harvey (Trevor Howard) for a thwarted tryst in his friend's apartment. However, due to the Hays Production Code, Wilder was unable to make a film about adultery in the 1940s. Wilder and Diamond also based the film partially on a Hollywood scandal in which high-powered agent Jennings Lang was shot by producer Walter Wanger for having an affair with Wanger's wife, actress Joan Bennett. During the affair, Lang used a low-level employee's apartment. Another element of the plot was based on the experience of one of Diamond's friends, who returned home after breaking up with his girlfriend to find that she had committed suicide in his bed.

Although Wilder generally required his actors to adhere exactly to the script, he allowed Lemmon to improvise in two scenes: In one scene, he squirts a bottle of nasal spray across the room, and in another, he sings while cooking spaghetti (which he strains through the grid of a tennis racket). In another scene, where Lemmon was supposed to mime being punched, he failed to move correctly, and was accidentally knocked down. Wilder chose to use the shot of the genuine punch in the film. Lemmon also caught a cold when one scene on a park bench was filmed in sub-zero weather.

Art director Alexandre Trauner used forced perspective to create the set of a large insurance company office. The set appeared to be a very long room full of desks and workers; however, successively smaller people and desks were placed to the back of the room, ending up with children. He designed the set of Baxter's apartment to appear smaller and shabbier than the spacious apartments that usually appeared in films of the day. He used items from thrift stores and even some of Wilder's own furniture for the set.

Music
The film's title theme, written by Charles Williams and originally titled "Jealous Lover", was first heard in the 1949 film The Romantic Age. A recording by Ferrante & Teicher, released as "Theme from The Apartment", reached #10 on the Billboard Hot 100 chart later in 1960.

Reception

The film made double its $3 million budget at the American box office in 1960. Critics were split on The Apartment. Time and Newsweek praised it, as did The New York Times film critic Bosley Crowther, who called the film "gleeful, tender, and even sentimental" and Wilder's direction "ingenious". Esquire critic Dwight Macdonald gave the film a poor review, calling it "a paradigm of corny avantgardism". Others took issue with the film's controversial depictions of infidelity and adultery, with critic Hollis Alpert of the Saturday Review dismissing it as "a dirty fairy tale".

MacMurray, having generally played guileless characters, related that after the film's release he was accosted by women in the street who berated him for making a "dirty filthy movie", and one of them hit him with her purse.
In 2001, Chicago Sun-Times film critic Roger Ebert gave the film four stars out of four, and added it to his Great Movies list. The film critic Clarisse Loughrey has identified it as one of her two favorite movies, along with the 2010 film Boy. The film holds a 93% "Certified Fresh" rating on Rotten Tomatoes, based on 103 reviews with an average rating of 8.8/10; the site's consensus states that "Director Billy Wilder's customary cynicism is leavened here by tender humor, romance, and genuine pathos. On Metacritic, the film has a score of 94 out of 100 based on 21 reviews, indicating "universal acclaim", and was awarded the "Must-See" badge.

Awards and nominations

Although Lemmon did not win the Oscar, Kevin Spacey dedicated his Oscar for American Beauty (1999) to Lemmon's performance. According to the behind-the-scenes feature on the American Beauty DVD, the film's director, Sam Mendes, had watched The Apartment (among other classic American films) as inspiration in preparation for shooting his film.

Within a few years after The Apartments release, the routine use of black-and-white film in Hollywood ended. Since The Apartment only two black-and-white movies have won the Academy Award for Best Picture: Schindler's List (1993)  and The Artist (2011).

In 1994, The Apartment was deemed "culturally, historically, or aesthetically significant" by the United States Library of Congress and selected for preservation in the National Film Registry. In 2002, a poll of film directors conducted by Sight and Sound magazine listed the film as the 14th greatest film of all time (tied with La Dolce Vita). In the 2012 poll by the same magazine directors voted the film 44th greatest of all time. The film was included in "The New York Times Guide to the Best 1,000 Movies Ever Made" in 2002. In 2006, Premiere voted this film as one of "The 50 Greatest Comedies Of All Time". The Writers Guild of America ranked the film's screenplay (written by Billy Wilder & I.A.L. Diamond.) the 15th greatest ever. In 2015, The Apartment ranked 24th on BBC's "100 Greatest American Films" list, voted on by film critics from around the world. The film was selected as the 27th best comedy of all time in a poll of 253 film critics from 52 countries conducted by the BBC in 2017.American Film Institute''' lists:
AFI's 100 Years...100 Movies (#93), 
AFI's 100 Years...100 Laughs (#20),
AFI's 100 Years...100 Passions (#62), 
AFI's 100 Years...100 Movies (10th Anniversary Edition) (#80).
AFI's 100 Years...100 Movie Quotes:
 Fran Kubelik: "Shut up, and deal." – Nominated

Stage adaptation

In 1968, Burt Bacharach, Hal David and Neil Simon created a musical adaptation titled Promises, Promises which opened on Broadway at the Shubert Theatre in New York City. Starring Jerry Orbach, Jill O'Hara and Edward Winter in the roles of Chuck, Fran and Sheldrake, the production closed in 1972. An all-star revival began in 2010 with Sean Hayes, Kristin Chenoweth and Tony Goldwyn as the three leads. This version added famous Bacharach/David songs "I Say a Little Prayer" and "A House Is Not a Home" to the roster.

See also
 List of American films of 1960
 Life in a... Metro Raaste Kaa Patthar''

Notes

References

External links

 The Apartment essay by Kyle Westphal at National Film Registry  
The Apartment essay by Daniel Eagan in America's Film Legacy: The Authoritative Guide to the Landmark Movies in the National Film Registry, A&C Black, 2010 , pages 566-558

1960 films
1960s American films
1960 comedy-drama films
1960 romantic comedy films
1960s business films
1960s Christmas comedy-drama films
1960s romantic comedy-drama films
1960s sex comedy films
Adultery in films
American black-and-white films
American business films
American Christmas comedy-drama films
American romantic comedy-drama films
American satirical films
American sex comedy films
Best Film BAFTA Award winners
Best Musical or Comedy Picture Golden Globe winners
Best Picture Academy Award winners
Compositions by Charles Williams
1960s English-language films
Films about businesspeople
Films about depression
Films directed by Billy Wilder
Films featuring a Best Musical or Comedy Actor Golden Globe winning performance
Films featuring a Best Musical or Comedy Actress Golden Globe winning performance
Films scored by Adolph Deutsch
Films set in apartment buildings
Films set in New York City
Films shot in New York City
Films whose art director won the Best Art Direction Academy Award
Films whose director won the Best Directing Academy Award
Films whose editor won the Best Film Editing Academy Award
Films whose writer won the Best Original Screenplay Academy Award
Films with screenplays by Billy Wilder
Films with screenplays by I. A. L. Diamond
Films set in 1959
Films set in offices
Films set around New Year
United Artists films
United States National Film Registry films
Workplace comedy films